The following is a timeline of the presidency of Joe Biden during the fourth and last quarter of 2021, from October 1 to December 31, 2021. To navigate between quarters, see timeline of the Joe Biden presidency.

Timeline

October 2021

November 2021

December 2021

See also
 List of executive actions by Joe Biden
 List of presidential trips made by Joe Biden (international trips)
 Timeline of the 2020 United States presidential election

References

 
 

2021 Q4
Presidency of Joe Biden
October 2021 events in the United States
November 2021 events in the United States
December 2021 events in the United States
Political timelines of the 2020s by year
Articles containing video clips